Lessons on Life is a Canadian drama film, directed by Jacques Leduc and released in 1989. The film stars Normand Chouinard as an unnamed magazine journalist who is reflecting on his life, and the important influence of three women on it, on the occasion of his 40th birthday.

The cast also includes Paule Baillargeon, Paule Marier, Hubert Reeves, Marcel Sabourin, Guy Nadon, Marie-Josée Gauthier, Frédérique Collin and France Castel.

The film won the Prix Luc-Perreault from the Association québécoise des critiques de cinéma at the Rendez-vous du cinéma québécois in 1990.

References

External links

1989 films
1989 drama films
Canadian drama films
Films shot in Quebec
Films set in Quebec
Films directed by Jacques Leduc
French-language Canadian films
1980s Canadian films